The 2019 Danilith Nokere Koerse was the 74th edition of the Nokere Koerse road cycling one day race. It was held on 20 March 2019 as part of the 2019 UCI Europe Tour in category 1.HC.

Teams
Twenty-five teams of up to seven riders started the race.

UCI WorldTeams

 
 
 
 
 
 
 
 
 

UCI Professional Continental Teams

 
 
 
 
 
 
 
 
 
 
 
 
 
 
 

UCI Continental Teams

Results

References 

Nokere Koerse
Nokere Koerse
Nokere Koerse